The Chamber of Deputies is the lower house of the bicameral national legislature of Rwanda.
It was created under the new Constitution adopted by referendum in 2003.

Composition
The Chamber is made up of 80 deputies. Of these, 53 are elected for five-years term by proportional representation and 24 are elected by provincial councils; of the remainder, two are appointed by the National Youth Council, and one by the Federation of the Associations of the Disabled.

Election results

Deputies elected to serve from 2018 to 2023 are as follows:

See also
 List of speakers of the Chamber of Deputies of Rwanda
 Senate of Rwanda, the upper house of the legislature

References

External links
 Chamber of Deputies

Parliament of Rwanda
Government of Rwanda
Rwanda
2003 establishments in Rwanda